Harold is a 2008 American comedy film co-written by Greg Fields and T. Sean Shannon, starring Spencer Breslin in the titular role, Cuba Gooding Jr., Nikki Blonsky, Ally Sheedy and Stella Maeve. It is Shannon's first full-length feature film and is partially adapted from his earlier short film, which itself was adapted from one of his Saturday Night Live sketches. It was also released six years after the death of Greg Fields.

Harold was filmed in August 2007 in and around Great Neck, Long Island, New York, and received a limited release on July 11, 2008, in Los Angeles, Miami, and New York City.

Plot

Harold Clemens is a 16-year-old boy with early male pattern baldness. Harold seems to cope all right in his hometown of Douglas, until his mom, Maureen, announces that the family is moving to a new house in Fredericksburg due to a promotion at her job. Harold panics, because he had somewhat fit in with everyone at his old school, despite his baldness.

When he arrives in his new house, Harold is met by an elderly new neighbor, Maude, who assumes Harold is older because of his baldness, and starts flirting with him. Harold starts at his new school, and because he initially wears a hat into class, he is seemingly accepted, especially by a girl, Evelyn, whom he briefly flirts with. When the teacher, Ms. Vicki Norris, notices him wearing a hat, he is forced to take it off, thus revealing that he is bald. Instantly he is ostracized by the other students, including Evelyn, and especially the school bullies—including the ringleader, Brad Denison.

Harold sees that some of the students ride go-karts to school, including Brad, and he asks his mother for one for his birthday; however, he instead receives a battery powered riding cart (the kind elderly people use) given to them by Maude, who had recently bought a newer model for herself. Harold is disappointed, but uses it anyway.

Harold's older sister, Shelley, has started high school in the new town as an immensely popular and flirty cheerleader. She meets a boy named Patrick and they quickly start dating, which leads to Patrick assuming that Harold is Shelley's father. Harold initially uses this to prank Patrick, threatening him should he mess with Harold's "lovely daughter" on their date, but Shelley angrily reveals the truth to Patrick. At first Patrick and his friends are mad at Harold, but Harold offers to make up for it by buying the boys some beer. When it works, Patrick's attitude toward Harold eases up.

Harold is bullied relentlessly by students. One of the few nice people is Cromer Styles, the school janitor. While in gym class, the bullying rears its ugly head and the coach joins in. Cromer comes to the rescue when he announces Harold is wanted in the office. That was just a decoy – Cromer and Harold watch TV in the janitor's room.

Harold returns home, angry and upset, and decides to go back to his old home, where everyone liked him. He leaves late at night so that his Mom and sister won't get suspicious. He only makes it as far as a strip bar. Harold thinks that because he looks older, he may pass for legal age, but Cromer is there as well, and he takes Harold home. He gives Harold words of encouragement, and then drops him off at home.

The next day in gym class, Harold is asked to take his shirt off as part of the Skins and Shirts team. He has a big strip of hair on his back, and everyone starts laughing at him. He talks to Cromer, and they decide to pull a prank on the coach, flushing the locker room toilets to overheat the water when the coach is in the shower.

 
Not wanting to go back to school, Harold buys a few beers for himself, and is followed by Maude, who still thinks that he is much older. When he tells her he is 14, she thinks that means the size of his manhood. When he explains he is only 14 years old, she is shocked, thinking he simply had good skin for an old man. She tells him to come back in a year.

Patrick and his buddies ask Harold for one more favor: to get them some beer for a party. Harold agrees, but only if they allow him to join them at the party, which they accept. Harold buys the beer, but while chatting with the boys at the party he is arrested by police, who believe him to be a major selling beer to minors. They do not believe him when he tells them that he is only fourteen. He is taken to the local police station and locked up with other inmates.

Later that night, Patrick encounters Shelley and tells her what happened to Harold. She is shocked and gets angry at Patrick for not helping Harold. She refuses to stay at the party with him, instead rushing off to get her mother and help her brother. Before she reaches the house, however, Harold is given a phone call, and talks to Cromer at the strip bar. Cromer bails him out, and drops Harold off at home, where Harold finds Shelley trying to decide whether or not to tell their mother about Harold or try helping him on her own to avoid getting him in trouble; she is relieved when she sees he is all right, and promises to keep it secret from their mother. The two become more friendly after this.

Patrick apologizes to Shelley the next day at school for what happened, and woos her by saying he is falling in love with her. Secretly betting with his friends about whether he can get Shelley to have sex with him before the school dance, it looks like the odds are in his favor again when Shelley falls for his romantic words. However, in the coming days, it is clear Shelley's under a lot of pressure when Patrick reveals his intentions. He threatens to take another girl to the motel room he's booked if she doesn't go with him. Harold finds Shelley crying in her room later, and she tells him the truth. Shelley tells Harold she doesn't really want to have sex, and is feeling too pressured by Patrick. Harold, recognizing Patrick the same way he sees Brad and his pack at school, decides to get revenge on him with Cromer for using Shelley. Shelley tells Patrick she has decided to go with him to the motel after all, pretending to agree to sleeping with him; they arrive there at night with Harold and Cromer waiting off to the side in the shadows. While Patrick is off to get sodas for them, Cromer helps Shelley out a back window, and when Patrick returns, the lights are off, and he has no idea that they have replaced Shelley with Maude. Patrick ends up having sex with her, and then runs out screaming when she turns on the lights and reveals herself. Patrick's friends, watching from a car out front, laugh at him.

Some of the kids at school hear how Harold was arrested and he begins to have it a little easier. However, Brad and his crew aren't finished; they write Harold a fake note from Evelyn, asking him out to the upcoming dance, and then they humiliate him when he shows up. Evelyn, none the wiser, reveals in confusion that she was supposed to meet a high school boy named Kevin at the dance. Harold walks out in a funk and snaps at Rhonda, a classmate who genuinely likes him, when she runs out to try to talk to him, and he leaves on his cart.

There is a go-kart race coming up, and Cromer decides Harold should enter. He soups up Harold's riding cart, adding a real engine to it which he removed from a school tractor. After they test it and balance out the defects, it's all ready for the race. The coach tries to tell Cromer that Harold can't enter due to safety regulations as his cart does not pass, but Cromer retaliates by threatening to tell the principal about some "funny things" Cromer found on the coach's browsing history in his office. Even though he's just making that up, the coach falls for it and backs off, allowing Harold in.

The bullies have entered the race and see that Harold is competing. They decide to sabotage his cart so he will crash; they secretly loosen the lug nuts on one wheel. During the race, the wheel pops off and the lug nuts all scatter; Harold and Cromer are shocked and think there's nothing they can do, but Shelley steps in and simply tells them to remove a single lug nut from the other three wheels and put them on the fallen wheel. Cromer does this, and Harold enters the race, still maintaining his balance. Brad, close to winning the race, sees Harold back in action and puts a dent in Harold's cart in order to slow him down. Rhonda, seeing this, comes up from behind and bashes the rear of Brad's cart, causing him to crash into the haystacks at the edge of the track. Brad is out of the picture, and Harold has pulled ahead of most of the contestants except for Brad's friends. A lady from the crowd, who happens to be a stripper at the bar Harold went to, shows her breasts to the bullies in order to distract them, enabling Harold to win the race, and, ultimately, the respect of the school. Harold receives a trophy, the coach congratulates him, and one of Brad's friends apologizes to him.

Maude meets one of the men cheering Harold on, who turns out to be Reedy, one of the regulars at the strip bar, and the two become enamored with each other. Evelyn kisses Harold and congratulates him, but Harold turns away from her, telling her to save that for Kevin. Back at home, he sees Reedy has moved in with Maude. Harold says hi to them and a few other neighbors along the way to Rhonda's house, where he greets her to take her out for a walk around town.

Cast

 Spencer Breslin as Harold Clemens
 Cuba Gooding Jr. as Cromer Styles
 Nikki Blonsky as Rhonda Baxter
 Ally Sheedy as Maureen Clemens
 Stella Maeve as Shelly Clemens
 Suzanne Shepherd as Maude Sellers
 Fred Willard as Dr. Richard Pratt
 Rachel Dratch as Ms. Norris
 Chris Parnell as Coach Vanderpool
 Elizabeth Gillies as Evelyn Taylor
 Dave Attell as Barker
 Daniel Farcher (credited as Dan "Dietz" Farcher) as Brad Denison
 Wass Stevens as Buck
 Derek Nelson as Mason
 Robert Gorrie as Patrick
 Dylan Snyder as Dylan
 Alan Aisenberg as Malcolm
 Paul Thornton as Mr. Kahane 
 Angel Sing as Chang  
 Colin Quinn as Reedy
 Nicky Katt as Police officer #1
 Lathan Mckay as Officer Shannon
 Nicola Peltz as Becki

Reception
Harold received negative reviews from critics. On Metacritic, the film has a weighted average score of 10%, based on reviews from five critics, indicating "overwhelming dislike".

New York Post film critic Lou Lumenick praised Breslin's role as the title character and called the movie overall "a genuine oddity that's more watchable than it sounds. Robert Abele from the Los Angeles Times criticized Shannon for following the "three-minute-idea mind-set" of Saturday Night Live when directing his script that's filled with humorless high school ridicule, "fogey-dom signposts", and elderly women gags, calling the film "a disingenuous, one-note underdog portrait." Nathan Lee, writing for The New York Times, called the film a "cinematic black hole" for heavily relying on its "single, repetitive, aggressively tedious joke" about a teenager being mocked for his physical and mental geriatric features, saying that: "Harold is the type of one-note dead zone ideally suited for a bathroom break while sitting home on a Saturday night, alone and semidrunk, in front of the television. At feature length it's enough to make you tear your hair out."

References

External links
 
 
 
 

2008 films
2008 comedy films
2008 directorial debut films
2000s American films
2000s coming-of-age comedy films
2000s English-language films
2000s high school films
2000s teen comedy films
American coming-of-age comedy films
American high school films
American teen comedy films
Films about bullying
Films shot in New York (state)
Saturday Night Live films